= SecurityPal =

American software company

SecurityPal, Inc.
- Type: Private
- Industry: Cybersecurity
- Founded: 2020; 6 years ago
- Founder: Pukar C. Hamal
- Headquarters: San Francisco, California, U.S.
- Key people: Pukar C. Hamal (Founder and CEO)
- Products: Customer assurance platform
- Website: securitypalhq.com

SecurityPal is an American software company that helps businesses complete security reviews and questionnaires. Founded in 2020 by Pukar C.Hamal, it is based in San Francisco with an operations center in Kathmandu, Nepal.

== History ==
SecurityPal was founded in 2020 by Pukar C. Hamal, with operations beginning out of an apartment in San Francisco. Prior to SecurityPal, Hamal co-founded Teamable in 2016, a recruiting software company that was acquired by TopFunnel in 2021. Hamal stated he founded SecurityPal after a questionnaire delayed a sales deal earlier in his career. In 2022, the company raised a total of $21 million in a Series A funding round. Hamal later stated the company did not need to raise additional capital.

SecurityPal began operations out of Kathmandu, Nepal and as of 2025 employed around 180 people.

== Products and services ==
SecurityPal's platform is used by companies to respond to security questionnaires and vendor risk assessments. The company pairs software with a team of human analysts who prepare and review the responses. Its service combines automated tools with human analysts to answer the security and compliance questions that companies receive from prospective customers.
